Jank is a German language family name. The family tree traces back to Hinrich Jank (1576–1673) of Oberlausitz.

People with the surname
Christian Jank (1833–1888), German scenic painter and stage designer
Angelo Jank (1868–1940), German animal painter, illustrator and member of the Munich Secession.
Klaus-Dieter Jank (born 1952), German footballer
Isa Jank (born 1952), birth name of Isa Andersen, German actress
Christoph Jank (born 1973), Austrian football player
Bohumil Jank (born 1992), Czech ice hockey player

References

German-language surnames